Brandon Lee Kaui Cablay (born March 1, 1978) is a Filipino-American former professional basketball player.

He started his career in the PBA in 2003 as a member of the Aces. He would win his first PBA championship in the 2003 PBA Invitational Conference, wherein Cablay was named Finals MVP. He was acquired by the San Miguel Beermen from the Aces in exchange for Nic Belasco.

References

External links
 Player Profile at PBA-Online!

1978 births
Living people
Alaska Aces (PBA) players
Basketball players from Hawaii
Filipino men's basketball players
Magnolia Hotshots players
Philippine Basketball Association All-Stars
San Miguel Beermen players
Shooting guards
Vanguard University alumni
American men's basketball players
Alaska Aces (PBA) draft picks
American sportspeople of Filipino descent
Citizens of the Philippines through descent